3180 may refer to:

In general
 A.D. 3180, a year in the 4th millennium CE
 3180 BC, a year in the 4th millennium BCE
 3180, a number in the 3000 (number) range

Other uses
 3180 Morgan, an asteroid in the Asteroid Belt, the 3180th asteroid registered
 Hawaii Route 3180, a state highway
 Louisiana Highway 3180, a state highway
 Texas Farm to Market Road 3180, a state highway

See also